Europium(III) nitrate is an inorganic compound with the formula Eu(NO3)3. Its hexahydrate is the most common form, which is a colorless hygroscopic crystal.

Preparation
Dissolving europium(III) oxide (Eu2O3) in dilute nitric acid produces europium(III) nitrate.
 Eu2O3 + 6 HNO3 → 2 Eu(NO3)3 + 3 H2O

Complexes
Europium(III) nitrate reacts with some ligands to form complexes. It reacts with 1,3,5-trimesic acid, producing europium metal-organic framework, a coordination polymer, under hydrothermal conditions.

References

Europium(III) compounds
nitrates